Brent Bobyck (born April 26, 1968) is a Canadian retired professional ice hockey left winger. He was selected 78th overall in the 1986 NHL Entry Draft by the Montreal Canadiens. Although he never played in the National Hockey League, he has played fourteen professional seasons for various teams in North America and the United Kingdom. He has also played for both the Canadian and the Great Britain national ice hockey teams.

Born in Regina, Saskatchewan, Bobyck currently runs his own power skating school in the Regina area and in the United Kingdom.

Playing career
While playing for the University of North Dakota, with whom he won the NCAA Division 1 championship, Bobyck was selected 78th overall by the Montreal Canadiens in the 1986 NHL Entry Draft. He played for their American Hockey League (AHL) farm team in 1990–91 as well as playing for the Albany Choppers in the International Hockey League (IHL) and the Winston-Salem Thunderbirds in the East Coast Hockey League (ECHL). The following season, 1991–92, he played for the Detroit Falcons in the Colonial Hockey League. In 1992–93, he signed with the Charlotte Checkers of the ECHL as well as playing for the Canada national men's ice hockey team.

In 1994 Bobyck signed for the Peterborough Pirates in the United Kingdom for whom he played for the next two seasons, finishing the 1995–96 season back in North America with the Daytona Beach Breakers in the Southern Hockey League.

Bobyck returned to the United Kingdom in 1996 to join the Nottingham Panthers for the inaugural season of the Ice Hockey Superleague (ISL). Playing for Nottingham for the next four seasons, he helped them to win the Benson & Hedges Cup in 1996 and 1998. After Nottingham failed to re-sign him for the 2000–01 season, Bobyck joined the Bracknell Bees, also in the ISL, as injury cover. After a few weeks Bobyck moved to the Sheffield Steelers, also as injury cover, before he finished the season with the Manchester Storm.

In 2001–02, Bobyck re-signed for Sheffield and remained with them for four seasons until he retired from ice hockey at the end of the 2004–05 season. During this time he helped Sheffield to win the playoffs in 2001–02, the league championship and the Challenge Cup in 2002–03, and the league championship and the playoffs in the Elite Ice Hockey League's inaugural season, 2003–04.

Having initially announced his retirement at the end of the 2003–04 season he was re-signed by Sheffield for the 2004–05 season after being offered a testimonial season. Having suffered an elbow injury, he only managed a handful of games the following season before he retired from playing in January 2005.

Honours and awards
Granted a testimonial season by Sheffield Steelers in 2004–05.

Career statistics

International play
Played for Canada in:
1989–90 touring team
1993–94 touring team

Played for Great Britain in:
1999 World Championships Pool A Qualifying Tournament

International statistics

References

External links

1968 births
Albany Choppers players
Bracknell Bees players
Canadian ice hockey left wingers
Charlotte Checkers (1993–2010) players
Detroit Falcons (CoHL) players
Fredericton Canadiens players
Ice hockey people from Saskatchewan
Living people
Manchester Storm (1995–2002) players
Montreal Canadiens draft picks
North Dakota Fighting Hawks men's ice hockey players
Nottingham Panthers players
Orlando Jackals players
Orlando Rollergators players
Sheffield Steelers players
Sportspeople from Regina, Saskatchewan
Vancouver VooDoo players
Winston-Salem Thunderbirds players
Canadian expatriate ice hockey players in England